Jennifer Rubin is the name of:

 Jennifer Rubin (actress) (born 1962), American actress and model
 Jennifer Rubin (columnist) (born 1962), American columnist and blogger for The Washington Post
 Jennifer Rubin (policy analyst), UK academic

See also
 Rubin (disambiguation)